Dafna Bar-Sagi is a cell biologist and cancer researcher at New York University School of Medicine. She is the Saul J. Farber Professor in the Department of Biochemistry and Molecular Pharmacology and the Department of Medicine and Senior Vice President and Vice Dean for Science at NYU Langone Health. Bar-Sagi has been a member of scientific advisory boards, including the National Cancer Institute, Starr Cancer Consortium, and Pancreatic Cancer Action Network.

Her research focuses on the nature of the Ras oncogene and how Ras signaling leads to tumor development, particularly in pancreatic cancer.

Early life

Education 
Dafna Bar-Sagi was born and raised in Israel. She attended Bar-Ilan University where she earned her undergraduate and master's degrees in neurobiology. She received her PhD in neurobiology in the United States from the State University of New York at Stony Brook (SUNY).

Career 
Dafna Bar-Sagi conducted her postdoctoral research in the lab of James Feramisco in Cold Spring Harbor Laboratory, where she worked on the nature of the Ras proteins in 1986, and eventually served as senior staff investigator.

In 1995, Bar-Sagi became faculty at the Department of Molecular Genetics and Microbiology at State University of New York (SUNY) at Stony Brook and served as the Department Chair from 2003 to 2006.

Bar-Sagi transitioned to NYU Langone Medical Center in 2006 as chair of the Department of Biochemistry. She became Vice Dean for Science and Chief Scientific Officer at NYU Langone Health in 2011. She became Executive Vice President in 2019.

Research 
Dafna Bar-Sagi's research began in 1986, while completing her postdoctoral work with Dr. James Feramisco in Cold Spring Harbor. Bar-Sagi and Feramisco were the first to observe how Ras protein facilitates cellular uptake of nutrients through macropinocytosis.

Bar-Sagi continues to study the function of Ras oncogenes and mutant Ras proteins in cell proliferation, survival, nutrient uptake, cell metabolism and tumorigenesis, particularly in pancreatic cancer. Recent studies in the Bar-Sagi lab have focused on the treatment of mutant KRAS cancer cells, and understanding how they withstand targeted therapies, as well as identification of novel therapeutic strategies for Ras-driven cancers.
Her research on interleukin-1β suggests that to fully understand the interactions between tumors, their environment, and immune system, researchers will have to find new methods of studying tumors in vivo.

Selected publications

Awards and honors 
 2020, Member, National Academy of Sciences
 2019, Fellow, American Association for Cancer Research (AACR)
 2018, AACR-Women in Cancer Research Charlotte Friend Memorial Lectureship, AACR
 2016, Outstanding Investigator Award, National Cancer Institute for cancer research in RAS mutations
 2014, Pancreatic Cancer Action Network Grant Recipient
 2008, Pancreatic Cancer Action Network Grant Recipient

Membership on Scientific Advisory Boards and Boards of Directors 

 National Cancer Institute Board of Scientific Advisors, Chair 2021
 Starr Cancer Consortium Scientific Review Board
 Pancreatic Cancer Action Network Scientific and Medical Advisory Board
AACR Board of Directors, 2016-2019

References

Year of birth missing (living people)
Living people
Bar-Ilan University alumni
Jewish scientists
Jewish women scientists
Cancer researchers
American women biologists
American biologists
American women biochemists
American biochemists
Fellows of the AACR Academy
21st-century American women